Jillian Clare "Jill" Morgan formerly Jillian Smith (born 12 June 1958) is a retired field hockey player from New Zealand, who was a member of the national team that finished sixth at the 1984 Summer Olympics in Los Angeles, California.

External links
 
 

1958 births
Living people
New Zealand female field hockey players
Olympic field hockey players of New Zealand
Field hockey players at the 1984 Summer Olympics
People from Taumarunui